Isaac Gómez Sánchez (born 28 October 1995), commonly known as Isi, is a Spanish footballer who plays as a midfielder for Deportivo de La Coruña.

Club career
Born in Madrid, Isi played in local Rayo Vallecano's every youth team. He was promoted to the under-19 side for the 2012–13 season.

On 17 March 2013, without even having appeared for the reserves, Isi was called up by first-team manager Paco Jémez for a La Liga away game against FC Barcelona, starting on the bench and being assigned number 39: with the game at 3–1 for the hosts he entered the field in the 85th minute, thus becoming the club's youngest player ever to appear in an official match at the age of 17 years and 140 days. During most of his spell, however, he was associated with the B side, competing in both Segunda División B and Tercera División.

On 11 August 2016, Isi signed for CF Fuenlabrada in the third division. He continued competing at that level the following years, with Club Recreativo Granada, UD Melilla, CD Badajoz and Deportivo de La Coruña.

Personal life
Isi's cousin, Adri Embarba, is also a footballer. A winger, he too played for Rayo.

References

External links

1995 births
Living people
Spanish footballers
Footballers from Madrid
Association football midfielders
La Liga players
Segunda División B players
Tercera División players
Primera Federación players
Rayo Vallecano players
Rayo Vallecano B players
CF Fuenlabrada footballers
Club Recreativo Granada players
UD Melilla footballers
CD Badajoz players
Deportivo de La Coruña players